Robben Lee Ford (born December 16, 1951) is an American blues, jazz, and rock guitarist. He was a member of the L.A. Express and Yellowjackets and has collaborated with Miles Davis, Joni Mitchell, George Harrison, Larry Carlton, Rick Springfield, Little Feat and Kiss. He was named one of the "100 Greatest Guitarists of the 20th Century" by Musician magazine.

Early life
Robben Ford was born in Woodlake, California, United States, and raised in Ukiah, California. He began playing the saxophone at age 10 and the guitar at age 14. Robben and two of his brothers (Patrick and Mark) created the Charles Ford Blues Band in honor of and named after their father. A fourth brother died in the Vietnam conflict.

Career
At age 18, Ford's band was hired to play with Charlie Musselwhite, and recorded two albums  The Charles Ford Band and Discovering the Blues.  He recorded two albums with Jimmy Witherspoon called Live and Spoonful.  In the 1970s, Ford joined the jazz fusion band, L.A. Express, led by saxophonist Tom Scott.  In 1974, the band supported George Harrison on his American tour and played on the Joni Mitchell albums The Hissing of Summer Lawns and Miles of Aisles.

After leaving the L.A. Express in 1976, Robben Ford recorded his first solo album, The Inside Story with a band that later became the Yellowjackets.

In 1977, Ford was one of half a dozen or so session players asked to play the guitar solo for the Steely Dan song "Peg." In the end, the group went with the version by Jay Graydon instead. In 2006, a tribute album to Steely Dan – The Royal Dan – was released, with Ford covering "Peg" in his own style.

In 1982, Ford was one of several guitarists who appeared on the KISS album Creatures of the Night, playing lead guitar on the songs "Rock And Roll Hell" and "I Still Love You".

Ford worked briefly with Miles Davis in 1986; and can be heard on Davis' Montreux box set. Ford released his second solo album Talk to Your Daughter in 1988.  He joined Philippe Saisse, Marcus Miller and J.T. Lewis in the cast of The Sunday Night Band for the second and final season of the late-night NBC television program Sunday Night in 1989. In the 1990s, he released the albums Robben Ford and the Blue Line, Mystic Mile, Handful of Blues, Tiger Walk and Supernatural.

Robben Ford has received five Grammy Award nominations and was named one of the "100 Greatest Guitarists of the 20th Century" by Musician magazine. He credited pianist and arranger Roger Kellaway and saxophonist and arranger Tom Scott, whom he met while playing for Joni Mitchell, as a major influence on his musical development.

Robben Ford was married to Anne Kerry Ford. As of 2022 he lives in Paris, France.

In October 2022, Ford toured in Italy with Eric Clapton as opening act.

Equipment

Guitars
Ford considers his first good electric a Guild Starfire III with a single Florentine (sharp) cutaway. He used a Gibson L-5 when he played with Charlie Musselwhite and the Ford Band, although he never thought it was a great guitar. While playing with Jimmy Witherspoon, Ford traded the L-5 plus $200 for a 1964 Gibson Super 400CES (which he sold in 1986). When Ford began playing with the L.A. Express and Joni Mitchell, he used a 1958 Gibson dot-neck ES-335.

After Ford's Talk to Your Daughter album was released in 1988, Robben used a Robben Ford Signature model guitar created in a collaboration with Dan Smith of Fender and produced in Japan between 1987 and 1993. That guitar was based on the Fender Master Series Esprit Ultra that was produced from 1983 to 1986 in Japan. In 1987, new management at Fender authorized the first production of the Robben Ford Signature guitar. In 1994, production of the guitar moved from Japan to the Fender Custom Shop. Three models were produced: Ultra FM (with a carved maple top), Ultra SP (with a carved spruce top), and the Elite FM (with a carved flame maple top). The guitar line continued to be produced until 2002 when it was discontinued by Fender.

Sometimes he plays a vintage 1960 Fender Telecaster, Gibson Les Pauls, or a 1963 Gibson SG. Ford also owns other guitars including a 1966 Epiphone Riviera (with the original Bigsby tremolo removed and replaced with a stop tailpiece).

In a May 1–16, 2017 tour which ended in Niagara Falls NY, Ford debuted a newly acquired 1953 Gibson Les Paul.

Amplifiers
Robben Ford uses Dumble Amplifiers and Celestion G12-65 speakers. In 1983, Alexander "Howard" Dumble made Robben's first Dumble Overdrive Special (serial #002) for Robben. Dumble himself is the owner of serial #001.

When traveling abroad he prefers taking his Dumble, but will sometimes use Fender Super Reverb or Fender Twin amplifiers. More recently Robben has been using Little Walter amplifiers at home and in the studio.

Discography

As leader/co-leader 
 Schizophonic (LA International, 1976)
 Live Jimmy Witherspoon & Robben Ford (LAX, 1977)
 The Inside Story (Elektra, 1979)
 Standing on the Outside (Lakeside, 1983)
 Talk to Your Daughter (Warner Bros., 1988)
 Minor Elegance with Joe Diorio (MGI, 1989)
 Robben Ford & the Blue Line (Stretch, 1992)
 Live at the Notodden Blues Festival with Jimmy Witherspoon (Blue Rock'it, 1992)
 Mystic Mile (Stretch, 1993)
 Handful of Blues (Stretch, 1995)
 Ain't Nothin' New About the Blues with Jimmy Witherspoon (AIM, 1995)
 Blues Connotation (ITM, 1997)
 The Authorized Bootleg (Blue Thumb, 1997)
 Discovering the Blues (Avenue, 1997)
 Tiger Walk (Blue Thumb, 1997)
 Sunrise (Avenue, 1999)
 Supernatural (GRP, 1999)
 A Tribute to Paul Butterfield (Blue Rock'it, 2001)
 Blue Moon (Concord, 2002)
 Keep On Running (Concord, 2003)
 Truth (Concord, 2007)
 Soul on Ten (Concord, 2009)
 Bullet with Renegade Creation (Blues Bureau, 2012)
 Bringing It Back Home (Provogue, 2013)
 A Day in Nashville (Provogue, 2014)
 Into the Sun (Provogue, 2015)
 Purple House (Ear Music, 2018)
 The Sun Room with Bill Evans (Ear Music, 2019)
 Common Ground with Bill Evans (13J Productions, 2020)
 Pure (Ear Music, 2021)

As a member 
Yellowjackets
 Yellowjackets (Warner Bros., 1981)
 Mirage a Trois  (Warner Bros., 1983)
 Run for Your Life (GRP, 1994)
 Timeline (Mack Avenue, 2011)

As sideman 

With Larry Carlton
 Live in Tokyo (335 Records, 2007)
 Unplugged (335 Records, 2013)

With Jing Chi (Jimmy Haslip, Vinnie Colaiuta)
 Jing Chi (Tone Center 2002)
 Jing Chi Live at Yoshi's (Shrapnel 2003)
 3D (Tone Center 2004)
 Supremo (Tone Center 2017)

With A. J. Croce
 A. J. Croce (Private Music, 1993)
 That's Me in the Bar (Private Music, 1995) 
 By Request (Compass Records, 2021)

With Tommy Emmanuel
 Can't Get Enough (Columbia, 1996)
 Midnight Drive (Higher Octave, 1997)

With Jerry Granelli
 A Song I Thought I Heard Buddy (Sing ITM, 1992)
 Dance Hall (Justin Time 2017)
 Koputai (ITM, 1990)
 One Day at a Time (ITM, 1990)

With Little Feat
 Down on the Farm (Warner Bros., 1979)
 Hoy-Hoy! (Warner Bros., 1981)

With Keiko Matsui
 A Drop of Water (Japan, 1986)
 Under Northern Lights (Japan, 1988)
 No Borders (MCA, 1990)

With Barry Manilow
 Here Comes the Night (Arista, 1982)
 Oh Julie! (Arista, 1982)

With Eric Marienthal
 Oasis (GRP, 1991)
 Turn Up the Heat (Peak, 2001)

With Amanda McBroom
 Dreaming (Gecko, 1986)
 Midnight Matinee (Analogue, 1991)

With Michael McDonald
 If That's What It Takes (Warner Bros., 1982)
 No Lookin' Back (Warner Bros., 1985)
 Blink of an Eye (Reprise, 1993)

With Charlie Musselwhite
 Louisiana Fog (Cherry Red, 1968)
 Takin' My Time (Arhoolie, 1971)
 Goin' Back Down South (Arhoolie, 1974)
 Tell Me Where Have All the Good Times Gone? (Blue Rock'it, 1984)
 One Night in America (Telarc, 2001)

With John Kaizan Neptune
 West of Somewhere (Milestone, 1981)
 Mixed Bag (Eastworld, 1983)

With Tom Scott
 Tom Cat (Ode, 1975)
 Reed My Lips (GRP, 1994)
 Night Creatures (GRP, 1995)
 Bluestreak (GRP, 1996)

With Supersonic Blues Machine
 West of Flushing South of Frisco (Provogue, 2016)
 Californisoul (Provogue, 2017)

With Jennifer Warnes
 Famous Blue Raincoat (Attic, 1986)
 The Hunter (Attic, 1992)

With Jimmy Witherspoon
 Spoonful (Blue Note, 1975)
 Live at the Mint (On the Spot, 1996)

With others
 Gregg Bissonette, Submarine (Favored Nations, 2000)
 David Blue, Com'n Back for More (Asylum, 1975)
 Perry Botkin Jr., Ports (A&M, 1977)
 Chris Cain, So Many Miles (Blue Rock'it, 2010)
 Julie Christensen, Love Is Driving (Stone Cupid, 1996)
 Randy Crawford, Secret Combination (Warner Bros., 1981)
 Tiffany Darwish, New Inside (MCA, 1990)
 Miles Davis, Tutu (Warner Bros., 2011)
 DeBarge, All This Love (Gordy, 1982)
 Bob Dylan, Under the Red Sky (Columbia, 1990)
 Richard Elliot, Initial Approach (ITI, 1984)
 Bill Evans, Big Fun (ESC, 2002)
 Georgie Fame, Cool Cat Blues (Go Jazz, 1991)
 Brandon Fields, The Other Side of the Story (Nova, 1988)
 Anne Kerry Ford, In the Nest of the Moon (Illyria, 1996)
 Ruthie Foster, The Truth According to Ruthie Foster (Shock, 2009)
 Kenny Garrett, Old Folks (West Wind, 1999)
 Dizzy Gillespie, Rhythmstick (1990)
 Kazu Matsui Project, Kazu Matsui Project featuring Robben Ford - Standing on the Outside (1983)
 Joni Mitchell, The Hissing of Summer Lawns (Asylum, 1975)
 Arlo Guthrie, Power of Love (Warner Bros., 1981)
 Charlie Haden, Helium Tears (NewEdition, 2005)
 George Harrison, Dark Horse (Apple, 1974)
 Amy Holland, On Your Every Word (Capitol, 1983)
 Christian Howes, Out of the Blue (Resonance, 2010)
 Rickie Lee Jones, Pop Pop (Geffen, 1991)
 Marc Jordan, A Hole in the Wall (Airplay, 1989)
 Kiss, Creatures of the Night (Casablanca, 1981)
 Greg Koch, Plays Well with Others (2013)
 Dave Koz, Lucky Man (Capitol, 1993)
 L.A. Express, L.A. Express (Caribou, 1976)
 Michael Landau, Renegade Creation (Blues Bureau, 2010)
 Sonny Landreth, From the Reach (Landfall, 2008)
 Neil Larsen, Orbit (Straight Ahead, 2007)
 Ricky Lawson, First Things First (Videoarts, 1998)
 Ute Lemper, Crimes of the Heart (CBS, 1989)
 Kenny Loggins, Celebrate Me Home (Columbia, 1977)
 Jeff Lorber, Step It Up (Heads Up, 2015)
 Bob Malach, The Searcher (Go Jazz, 1995)
 Herbie Mann, Opalescence (Gaia, 1989)
 John Mayall, In the Palace of the King (Eagle, 2007)
 Brownie McGhee, Facts of Life (Blue Rock'it, 1985)
 Keb' Mo', Keep It Simple (Epic, 2004)
 Claus Ogerman, Claus Ogerman Featuring Michael Brecker (GRP, 1991)
 Brad Paisley, American Saturday Night (Arista, 2009)
 Paul Personne, Lost in Paris Blues Band (Verycords, 2016)
 Shawn Phillips, Do You Wonder (A&M, 1975)
 Bonnie Raitt, Luck of the Draw (Capitol, 1991)
 Kenny Rankin, Hiding in Myself (Cypress, 1988)
 Rudy Rotta, Some of My Favorite Songs for... Pepper (Cake, 2006)
 Leon Russell, Life Journey (Universal, 2014)
 David Sanborn, Hearsay (Elektra, 1994)
 Marilyn Scott, Without Warning! (Mercury, 1983)
 Barbra Streisand, Streisand Superman (Columbia, 1977)
 Sanne Salomonsen, In a New York Minute (Virgin, 1998)
 Rick Springfield, Working Class Dog (RCA, 1980)
 Eric Tagg, Dreamwalkin (Pony Canyon, 2015)
 Toots Thielemans, East Coast West Coast (Private Music, 1994)
 William Topley, Mixed Blessing (Mercury, 1998)
 Walter Trout, We're All in This Together (Provogue, 2017)
 Carl Verheyen, Trading 8s (Cranktone, 2009)
 Sadao Watanabe, Encore! (JVC, 2017)
 Steve Weingart, Life Times Vol. 01 (Skeewa Music, 2003)
 Bruce Willis, If It Don't Kill You It Just Makes You Stronger (Motown, 1989)
 Tsuyoshi Yamamoto, Another Holiday (Warner Bros., 1985)
 Jesse Colin Young, The Perfect Stranger (Elektra, 1982)

Videos
 Robben Ford and the Blue Line:  In Concert (Recorded April 7, 1993)
 Robben Ford:  New Morning - The Paris Concert (Recorded May 2001)
 Playing the Blues (2002)
 The Blues and Beyond (2002)
 Back to the Blues (2004)
 Autour Du Blues:  Larry Carlton and Robben Ford (2006)
 The Robben Ford Clinic: The Art of Blues Rhythm (2007)
 Robben Ford: In Concert: Revisited (2008)
 The Robben Ford Clinic: The Art of Blues Solos (2009)
 Robben Ford Trio: New Morning the Paris Concert:  Revisited (2009)

References

External links
Official website

1951 births
Living people
People from Ukiah, California
People from Woodlake, California
Guitarists from California
Jazz musicians from California
20th-century American guitarists
20th-century American male musicians
21st-century American guitarists
21st-century American male musicians
American blues guitarists
American jazz guitarists
American male guitarists
American rock guitarists
Lead guitarists
American male jazz musicians
Elektra Records artists
MCA Records artists
Warner Records artists
Yellowjackets members
Provogue Records artists